Gözlüçayır is a village in the Çemişgezek District, Tunceli Province, Turkey. The village is populated by Kurds of the Ferhadan and Qoçan tribes and had a population of 108 in 2021.

The hamlets of Bağlıca and Vakıflar are attached to the village.

References 

Kurdish settlements in Tunceli Province
Villages in Çemişgezek District